Etafenone is a vasodilator which has been used as an antianginal agent.

References 

Vasodilators
Aromatic ketones
Phenol ethers
Diethylamino compounds